Uranophora walkeri is a moth in the subfamily Arctiinae. It was described by Herbert Druce in 1889. It is found from Costa Rica and Panama to Peru.

References

Moths described in 1889
Euchromiina